Tracy Ryan (born February 8, 1971) is a Canadian film, television, and stage actress, best known to television audiences for her roles as Calla McDeere in Family Passions, Nancy Drew in the 1995 television series adaptation and Helen McKay in Young Drunk Punk. She was also the English voice actress of Roll Caskett in the Mega Man Legends series.

She graduated from Cameron Heights in Kitchener, Ontario, Canada. She attended the University of Toronto and graduated with a Bachelor of Arts Degree combined major in Drama and Irish Studies in 1992.  

She has been married to actor and comedian Bruce McCulloch of The Kids in the Hall since 2003, and they have two children together.

Filmography

References

External links

Living people
20th-century Canadian actresses
21st-century Canadian actresses
Actresses from Kitchener, Ontario
Canadian film actresses
Canadian stage actresses
Canadian television actresses
Canadian voice actresses
University of Toronto alumni
1971 births